At the creation of Belgium in 1831, there were 2,739 municipalities in the country, which had fallen to 2,663 municipalities by 1961. Following a series of decisions and actions, carried out in 1975, 1983 and 2019, the fusion of the Belgian municipalities reduced the national total to 581 municipalities. Of these, the following is a list of the 300 municipalities in the Flemish Region of Belgium. The numbers refer to the location of the municipalities on the maps of the respective provinces.

List

Notes

See also 

 List of municipalities of Belgium
 List of cities in Flanders

Flemish Region